Jean-Hippolyte Flandrin (23 March 1809 – 21 March 1864) was a French Neoclassical painter. His most celebrated work, Jeune Homme Nu Assis au Bord de la Mer ("Young Male Nude Seated beside the Sea"), from 1836, is held in the Louvre.

Biography

Early life
From an early age, Flandrin showed interest in the arts and a career as a painter. However, his parents pressured him to become a businessman, and having very little training, he was forced to instead become a miniature painter.

Hippolyte was the second of three sons, all of whom were painters in some aspect. Auguste, his older brother, spent most of his life as a professor at Lyon and later died there. Paul, his younger brother, was a painter of portraits and religious imagery. He married Aimée-Caroline Ancelot (1822-1882) in 1843, to whom was born Paul Hippolyte Flandrin (1856-1921), who become painter of sacred art, portraitist and decorator.

Hippolyte and Paul spent some time at Lyon, saving to leave for Paris in 1829 and study under Louis Hersent. Eventually, they settled in the studio of Jean-Auguste-Dominique Ingres, who became not only their instructor but their friend for life. At first, Hippolyte struggled as a poor artist. However, in 1832, he won the Prix de Rome for his painting Recognition of Theseus by his Father. This prestigious art scholarship meant that he was no longer limited by his poverty.

Career
The Prix de Rome allowed him to study for five years in Rome. While there, he created several paintings, increasing his celebrity both in France and Italy. His painting St. Clair Healing the Blind was created for the Nantes Cathedral, and years later, it also brought him a medal of the first class at the exhibition of 1855 ; this painting was destroyed in the fire which took place at Nantes Cathedral on 18 July 2020. Jesus and the Little Children was given by the government to the town of Lisieux. Dante and Virgil visiting the Envious Men struck with Blindness and Euripides writing his Tragedies are now in the Museum of Fine Arts in Lyon.

In 1853, Flandrin was elected to the Académie des Beaux-Arts. On April 4, 1856, he assisted in the founding of the Œuvre des Écoles d'Orient,  better known as L'Œuvre d'Orient; he was a member of its first general council at April 25, 1856. Upon his return to Paris in 1856, Flandrin received a commission from the chapel of St John in the church of St Séverin. As a result, his reputation became even more impressive, virtually guaranteeing him continuous employment for the rest of his life.

In addition to these works, Flandrin also painted a great number of portraits, including Portrait of Napoleon III, who was not very well received by the sitter. However, he is much more known today for his monumental decorative paintings. The most notable of these are found in the following locations:

 in the sanctuary, choir, and nave of St Germain des Prés at Paris (1842–1861)
 in the church of St Paul at Nîmes (1848–1849)
 of St Vincent de Paul at Paris (1850–1854)
 in the church of St-Martin-d'Ainay at Lyon (1855)

Death
In 1863, his failing health, made worse by his hard work and extended exposure to the damp and draughts of churches, induced him to visit Italy again, where he died of smallpox in Rome on 21 March 1864.

Main works
 Portrait of Madame Oudiné, 1840 (Musée des Beaux-Arts de Lyon)
 Study (Young Male Nude Seated Beside the Sea), 1836 (Louvre Museum)
 Dante in Hell, 1835 (Musée des beaux-arts de Lyon)

Gallery

References

External links

 Catholic Encyclopedia entry
 Delaborde, Lettres et pensies de H. Flandrin (Paris, 1865) Beul, Notice historique sur H. F. (1869).
 Jeune homme nu assis au bord de la mer

19th-century French painters
French male painters
Artists from Lyon
Academic art
Members of the Académie des beaux-arts
Recipients of the Pour le Mérite (civil class)
Prix de Rome for painting
Officiers of the Légion d'honneur
1809 births
1864 deaths
Deaths from smallpox
Infectious disease deaths in Lazio
Burials at Père Lachaise Cemetery
19th-century French male artists